Marco Antonio Macias Vargas (born ) is a former Mexican male volleyball player. He was part of the Mexico men's national volleyball team. On club level he played for A.J.Fonte do Bastardo.

References

External links
 profile at FIVB.org

1985 births
Living people
Mexican men's volleyball players
Place of birth missing (living people)